John Patrick Rooney (December 13, 1927 – September 15, 2008) was the chairman and founder of the Fairness Foundation, whose goal is to help low-income Americans with education and health care. He is the father of Medical Savings Accounts, now known as Health Savings Accounts. He had been the chairman of Golden Rule Insurance Company.

Civil rights work
In 1976, Rooney successfully led a fight against discrimination in insurance agent testing with an eight-year lawsuit against the State of Illinois and the Educational Testing Service. The suit charged discrimination against minority applicants. Estimated cost of the litigation and experts was approximately $2 million. The civil rights case was settled with a precedent-setting agreement that requires a method of constructing exams designed to eliminate unnecessary racial disparities.

Education
Rooney's advocacy for school vouchers made national headlines in 1991 with his founding of the Educational Choice Charitable Trust. The Educational Choice Charitable Trust provides tuition assistance for students from lower-income families in Indianapolis whose parents want them to attend a private school. Rooney's action in Indianapolis spurred interest in vouchers in other parts of the country. There are over 60 such programs with over 53,000 students in privately-funded educational choice programs, based upon Rooney's original model.

America's PAC
Rooney received attention in the fall of 2006 United States Congressional elections, after America's PAC, a group to which Rooney donated $900,000, ran controversial ads alleging that Democrats "want to abort black babies". Of the 27 radio ads that ran during the 2006 election cycle, two dealt with the abortion issue. The spokesman for the group is Herman Cain, an African American radio talk show host, author, and candidate, for the Republican Party nomination in the 2012 presidential election.

Helping the uninsured

In October 2006, Mr. Rooney was the subject of a NUVO Dispatch titled "Defending the Uninsured." which reported "Rooney has found that hospitals have made a common practice of charging 3.5 times what Medicare will pay for services. While Rooney acknowledges that hospitals may need to charge more than Medicare will pay, he contends that authoritative research shows that Medicare plus 25 percent is the reasonable amount for hospitals to charge…. 'Nationally, 35 percent of Hispanics are uninsured; 22 percent of African-Americans are uninsured; and 11 percent of non-Hispanic Caucasians are uninsured. So when you're doubling, tripling, multiplying the price by five times, you're doing it mainly to minority people,' Rooney says. 'I consider that racial discrimination.' NUVO goes on to report: "Rooney believes that people need tools to defend themselves. 'They need to know how to deal with the hospital and the evidence is if they deal with the hospital correctly almost all the time the hospital will forgive the bill … The hospital is only entitled to collect a reasonable fee. There is case law exactly on this subject. When they enter the hospital, if they sign an unconditional commitment it's generally not binding because they're under duress.' Rooney has made helping the uninsured a focus of the Fairness Foundation. The foundation has allied itself with lawyers willing to represent people in disputes over hospital bills and has set up a toll free number that people call for help: 800-742-3441. Rooney emphasizes that talking people through the process of dealing with hospitals requires patience, stamina and verbal skills. The Fairness Foundation, he says, is equipped to not only give people useful information but to talk them through what they need to do. 'A sick person is not in a position to adequately defend themselves,' Rooney says. 'But that doesn't mean they can't be defended.'"

Death
Rooney died at home in Indianapolis, Indiana, on September 15, 2008, aged 80.

References

External links
The Fairness Foundation

1927 births
2008 deaths
American businesspeople in insurance
American civil rights activists
Businesspeople in insurance
People from Indianapolis